Duck Stab!/Buster & Glen, later renamed as just Duck Stab, is the fifth studio album by American art rock group The Residents, released in November 1978. It is named after the first side of the album, Duck Stab!, a seven-song EP released earlier in 1978 featuring shorter songs similar to the first side of Fingerprince. Buster and Glen, the B-side of the album, was intended to follow Duck Stab! presumably in early 1979.

After the first pressing of Duck Stab! quickly sold out—which was an oddity for the band—they decided to re-release it as an album, merged with the unreleased Buster and Glen. This was also in part due to the audio quality of the original EP, which The Residents stated was poor.

The shorter length of the songs made the album more accessible for fans who had recently heard "Satisfaction", and songs like "Constantinople" and "Hello Skinny" helped cement the band's cult following.  This album features guitar by Philip "Snakefinger" Lithman.

The album was also included in the book 1001 Albums You Must Hear Before You Die.

Track listing 
All tracks written and composed by The Residents, except "Sinister Exaggerator", composed by The Residents and Snakefinger.

1987 CD bonus tracks 
Tracks 15-18 taken from the 1980 EP Diskomo/Goosebump.

2018 pREServed edition

Personnel 
The Residents – arranger, producer

Guests
Snakefinger – vocals, guitar
Ruby – vocals on "The Electrocutioner"
G. Whifler – photography
Pore No Graphics - cover art

Covers
 American punk band Ism recorded an uptempo cover of "Constantinople" (with a part of "Blue Rosebuds" in the middle) and released it on a 12" EP in 1984, also entitled Constantinople.
 "Blue Rosebuds" was covered by Shock Headed Peters on the compilation album Devastate to Liberate in December 1985.
 Primus released a medley of the songs "Hello Skinny" and "Constantinople" on the Caroline Records compilation promotional CD On the Nineties Tip... in 1990, and included it as a bonus track on the 2002 reissue of Frizzle Fry.  Shortly afterward, they covered "Sinister Exaggerator" on their 1992 EP Miscellaneous Debris.  In the UK, it was on the CD single "Making Plans for Nigel (Cheesy EP 2)."
 "Bach is Dead" is covered by Idiot Flesh on their 1997 album Fancy.
 "Hello Skinny" and "The Electrocutioner" are covered by Flat Earth Society on their 2000 album Bonk.
 Friendly Rich and the Lollipop People covered "Blue Rosebuds" on their 2010 album The Sacred Prune of Remembrance.

References

The Residents albums
1978 albums
Ralph Records albums